This page contains a list of academic journals covering archaeology, the study of the human past through material remains.

Before the advent of the modern journal format, the Society of Antiquaries of London published Vetusta Monumenta, a series of illustrated folios on antiquarian studies which appeared at irregular intervals between 1718 and 1909. Beginning in 1770, papers delivered at the society's meetings were also published in quarto format in Archaeologia (last published in 2007), and from 1843 in the Proceedings of the Society of Antiquaries of London, which is still published today under the title Antiquaries Journal. Other early archaeological journals that are still active include The Archaeological Journal and La Revue Archéologique, both first published in 1844, Archaeologia Cambrensis, published by the Cambrian Archaeological Association since 1846, and Sussex Archaeological Collections, published by the Sussex Archaeological Society since 1848.

Apart from the dedicated academic publications listed here, scholarship in archaeology is also published in general-purpose scientific journals such as Science or Nature, and in semi-scholarly periodicals such as Archaeology, Discover, National Geographic, or Scientific American. In North America, archaeology is considered one of the four subfields of anthropology, so papers on archaeology are often published in general anthropology journals, for example American Anthropologist or Current Anthropology. Environmental archaeology is often published in multi-disciplinary environmental science journals, such as Quaternary International or The Holocene, or less commonly, in ecology or development studies journals.

Archaeology journals are dominated by men. Across publications, there are two to three times more papers by male authors than by women. Many archaeology journals also show a gender citation gap: articles written by women are less likely to be cited, especially by men. Studies have generally shown that the imbalance in publication rates is because archaeology journals receive fewer submissions from women, rather than any detectable bias in the peer review processes. In recent years the number of women authors have increased but, gendered publication rates are not equal. As well as gender, archaeological publishing is also homogenous in terms of race, ethnicity and sexual orientation; more prestigious journals tend to be dominated by straight, white, cisgender men.

Active publications

Defunct publications

See also 
 :Category:Archaeology journals
 Lists of academic journals

References

Further reading 

 Heyworth et al. 1995, Internet archaeology: an international electronic journal for archaeology, Analecta Praehistorica Leidensia 28.
 Hole, B. 2012.  A Call for Open Scholarship in Archaeology, in Bonacchi, C, (ed.) Archaeologists and Digital Communication: Towards Strategies of Public Engagement. Archetype: London, UK.

Archaeology